The Bavarian State Orchestra is the orchestra of the Bavarian State Opera in Munich, Germany.

Profile

Its origins stretch back, however, to 1523 and the times of composer Ludwig Senfl, when sacred music was the focus of work.

In 1653 the first opera performances took place in Munich, adding to and greatly realigning the musicians' activities. In 1762 the ensemble was titled  (orchestra to the Bavarian court), a position it already effectively held.

In 1781 Mozart conducted the musicians in the world premiere of his opera Idomeneo, written in Munich. During the 1860s the orchestra, by then an integral part of the Hofoper (Court Opera), gave the world premieres of the Wagner operas Die Meistersinger von Nürnberg, Tristan und Isolde, and Das Rheingold, followed in 1870 by Die Walküre. Hans von Bülow was active as conductor at that time. Upon the German Revolution of 1918–1919 the name changed again, to its present form, reflecting the demise of the Bavarian monarchy.

The Bavarian State Orchestra is today part of the Bavarian State Opera company, Germany's largest, which it serves as pit ensemble, based in Munich's National Theatre. Richard Strauss, Bruno Walter, Hans Knappertsbusch, Clemens Krauss, Ferenc Fricsay, Joseph Keilberth, and Wolfgang Sawallisch have served in this position. The orchestra had a long and successful cooperation (1968–1997) with Carlos Kleiber, though he never served as GMD. Zubin Mehta held the post from 1998 to 2006. He was succeeded by Kent Nagano, who was replaced by Kirill Petrenko in September 2013. In 2021 Vladimir Jurowski took over as GMD.

The orchestra is one of seven such professional bodies in the city of Munich, its neighbors being the orchestra of the Staatstheater am Gärtnerplatz, the Bavarian Radio Symphony Orchestra, the Munich Radio Orchestra (a second radio ensemble), the Munich Philharmonic (operated by the City at its Gasteig venue), the Munich Symphony Orchestra, and the smaller-scale Munich Chamber Orchestra (Münchener Kammerorchester, MKO).

General music directors 

 1836–1867 Franz Lachner
 1867–1869 Hans von Bülow
 1870–1877 Franz Wüllner
 1872–1896 Hermann Levi
 1894–1896 Richard Strauss
 1901–1903 Hermann Zumpe
 1904–1911 Felix Mottl
 1913–1922 Bruno Walter
 1922–1935 Hans Knappertsbusch
 1937–1944 Clemens Krauss
 1945 Hans Knappertsbusch
 1946–1952 Georg Solti
 1952–1954 Rudolf Kempe
 1956–1958 Ferenc Fricsay
 1959–1968 Joseph Keilberth
 1971–1992 Wolfgang Sawallisch
 1992–1998 Peter Schneider (interim)
 1998–2006 Zubin Mehta
 2006–2013 Kent Nagano
 2013–2020 Kirill Petrenko
 2021– Vladimir Jurowski

References

External links 
 
 Bayerisches Staatsorchester at the Bach Cantatas Website

1523 establishments in the Holy Roman Empire
16th-century establishments in Bavaria
German symphony orchestras
Music in Munich
Musical groups established in the 16th century
Organizations established in the 1520s